Kazım Çelik (born 6 January 2000) is a Turkish professional footballer who plays as a forward.

Professional career
Çelik made his professional debut with Kayserispor in a 5-0 Süper Lig loss to Alanyaspor on 24 November 2018.

References

External links
 
 
 
 Kayserispor Profile

2000 births
Living people
People from Melikgazi
Turkish footballers
Galatasaray S.K. footballers
Kayserispor footballers
Tarsus Idman Yurdu footballers
Süper Lig players
TFF Second League players
Association football forwards